The 2004 King's Cup finals were held from November 30 to December 1, 2004, in Bangkok  The King's Cup (คิงส์คัพ) is an annual football tournament; the first tournament was played in 1968. 

The tournament was reverted to a knockout competition, starting from the semi-finals. 

Slovakia won the tournament defeating Thailand on penalties. Hungary and Estonia were the other teams to play in this tournament.

Bracket

Matches

Semi finals

3/4 Place Match

Final

Winner

External links
RSSSF

King's Cup
King